Terry Cole-Whittaker (born December 3, 1939, in Los Angeles), or Dr. Terry, is a New Thought author and United Church of Religious Science minister, and the founder of Terry Cole-Whittaker Ministries and Adventures in Enlightenment.

History
 
She became familiar with what she calls the "principles of prosperity" through the actions of a teacher in high school. She would later go on to enter the Mrs. America Pageant, becoming Mrs. California and winning third place in the national competition. She later joined the Los Angeles Civic Light Opera and became an opera singer. She would not stay in this position long, however. She went on to start a company, Success Plus, in which she became one of the first conductors of human potential seminars for corporations, becoming a motivational and inspirational speaker. 

She went on to earn a Doctor of Divinity degree in 1973, and was ordained as a minister of the United Church of Religious Science in 1975, and became the pastor of a fifty-member congregation of that church in La Jolla in 1977. The church grew under her leadership, drawing numbers as high as 5,000 for Easter Sunday, and eventually expanded to include a grammar school, ministry school, and five teaching centers. She also began a television program in 1979, which at one time was syndicated to fifteen television stations in the country. Stressing that “You can have it all — now!,” she encouraged her listeners, week after week, to seek prosperity, power, and abundance. 

In 1982, Cole-Whittaker left the United Church of Religious Science and founded Terry Cole-Whittaker Ministries. She drew over 4,000 people to her weekly services and  provided her followers with newsletters and instructional videos. Her celebrity parishioners included: Gavin MacLeod, Linda Gray, Lily Tomlin, and Eydie Gormé. Despite raising $6 million in 1984, her ministry raked in a debt of around $400,000 in 1985, prompting her to cease production of the television show and leave her congregation during Easter. By October, she had created a new foundation, Adventures in Enlightenment, which organized “spiritual” adventure tours allowing participants to meet with her one-on-one in exotic locations, e.g. Machu Picchu, the Himalayas.

The Foundation later purchased land in Washington to build a retreat center and start an organic farm and started an ashram and library in India to teach Westerners traditional Indian religion.

Published works
 What You Think of Me is None of My Business (1979).
 How to Have More in a Have Not World (1983).
 Inner Path from the Goddess Within
 Dare to Be Great (2001)
 Creating Your Destiny – A Remarkable Guide to Making Decisions that Give You Happiness and Prosperity
 Every Saint Has a Past, Every Sinner a Future:Seven Steps to the Spiritual and Material Riches of Life
 The Inner Path from where you are to where you want to be
 Love and Power in a World without Limits
 Live Your Bliss (2009)

References

Further reading
 Ronald Enroth. “Self-Styled Evangelist Stretches God's Truth”, Christianity Today 28 (21 Sept. 1984): 73–75.
 D. Keith Mano. “Terry Cole-Whittaker”, People 22 (26 Nov. 1984): 99–106.

External links
 ISBNdb search of author's works
 Biography from Terrycolewhitaker.com
 Time Magazine article

1939 births
Living people
Mrs. America (contest) delegates
New Thought writers
People from San Diego
Religious Science clergy